BCR Open Romania may refer to:

BRD Năstase Ţiriac Trophy, an ATP men's tennis tournament formerly known as the 'BCR Open Romania'
BCR Open Romania Ladies, an ITF women's tennis tournament